Richard L. Page is Chair of the Department of Medicine at the University of Wisconsin School of Medicine and Public Health and holds the George R. and Elaine Love Professor endowed Chair.

Education
Page received his bachelor's and medical degrees from Duke University and the Duke University School of Medicine, followed by residency and specialty training at Massachusetts General Hospital in Boston, Massachusetts. He then completed a fellowship at Duke and joined the Duke faculty.

Career
He later moved to UT Southwestern Medical Center, and in 2002 to the University of Washington School of Medicine, where he served as head of the Division of Cardiology until 2009. He then joined the faculty of the University of Wisconsin-Madison as head of the Department of Medicine and the George R. and Elaine Love Professor endowed Chair.

He has served as the president of the Heart Rhythm Society and as president of the Association of Professors of Cardiology.

Page is on the editorial board of the journals Circulation, Heart Rhythm, and the Journal of Cardiovascular Electrophysiology.

Page is chair of the Food and Drug Administration's Circulatory System Devices Panel.

References

External links
 UW Health page

University of Wisconsin–Madison faculty
Year of birth missing (living people)
Living people
Duke University School of Medicine alumni
21st-century American physicians
American cardiologists
Duke University alumni